Steenbergen is a town and municipality in North Brabant, the Netherlands. Steenbergen may also refer to
Battle of Steenbergen (1583)
Steenbergen, De Wolden, a hamlet in the south of Drenthe, the Netherlands
Steenbergen, Noordenveld, a hamlet in the north of Drenthe, the Netherlands
Steenbergen (surname)